Prior to the amendment of Tamil Nadu Entertainments Tax Act 1939 on 22 July 2006, Gross was 115 per cent of Nett for all films. Post-amendment, Gross equalled Nett for films with pure Tamil titles. Commercial Taxes Department disclosed 12.24 crore in entertainment tax revenue for the year.

The following is a list of films produced in the Tamil film industry in India, which were released theatrically in 2008. They are presented in order of their release dates

Films

January—March

April–June

July–September

October–December

The following films also released in 2008, though the release date remains unknown.

Awards

References

2008
Lists of 2008 films by country or language